Guest Host Displays, Dichroic Displays, Polymer Dispersed Displays

Guest host displays are similar to more common liquid crystal displays, but also include polymers, inorganic particles, or dichroic dye within the liquid crystal matrix.

In dichroic dye displays, as the birefringence of the host liquid crystals change from planar to perpendicular orientation, the guest dyes also change orientation, from absorbing / planar orientation, to non-absorbing / perpendicular orientation.

Unlike common TN (Twisted Nematic) or STN (Super Twisted Nematic) liquid crystal displays, guest host displays are typically driven direct, and are not usually multiplex driven.

In addition, guest host displays usually require higher operating voltages than TN or STN displays.  For example, the polymer dispersed liquid crystal display (also called a P.D.L.C. display), is usually operated at voltages from 4.5 V to 24 V to as high as 100 V.  Similarly, dichroic dye containing guest host displays, require voltages from 4.5 V to 10 V and higher.

However, the P.D.L.C. display and many dichroic dye containing guest host displays, such as the White-Taylor Phase Change display, do not require polarizers, which is a significant advantage over TN or STN displays. Lacking polarizers these displays commonly have lower contrast than TN or STN displays, But are often sunlight readable, and usually have no backlight, and hence no backlight glare.

Polarizer free displays enable low cost devices, since the polarizer is one of the more expensive components comprising the common liquid crystal display.

Lacking polarizers, the guest host display substrates can be manufactured from low cost birefringent plastic films.  And the plastic film substrates enable additional economies such as continuous R2R manufacturing (Roll to Roll manufacturing) of the displays, with its inherent economies over batch manufacturing processes.

Continuous manufacturing of displays is described in U.S. Patents 4,228,574, 4,924,243, 4,094,058, and patents pending.

In some cases, the R2R manufacturing of the guest host displays can be integrated with other roll to roll manufacturing process.  For example, automated pick and place machines, such as a rotary circuit board placement machine from  M.G.S.  or a linear actuator, VonWeise actuator, with bulk tube feeders from  M.M.T.F.,  U.I.C.T.F., T.F., can automate the placement of driver circuit boards and other components.

Advances in A.C.A. and A.C.F. conductive adhesives further enable the automated assembly of displays.

Recent advances in transparent conductive polythiophene coated substrates make display electrodes which resist cracking and breaking, unlike common oxide based transparent conductors.

Advances in Nanoimprint Lithography (N.I.L.) enable precise micro scale and nano scale embossing of display spacers, gaskets, and edge seals R2R.  Processes similar to N.I.L. are described in U.S. Patents 5,544,582, 5,365,356, 5,268,782, 5,539,5454,720,173, 5,559621, and patents pending.

Dr. Ernest Lueder teaches that "...(SiOx and Ormocer coated plastic films have O2 and H2O permeations) sufficiently low for maintaining a proper operation of the most sensitive FLCD cells."

Flexible substrates also enable greater design flexibility for the product designer, allowing flexible, conformal, die cut displays which complement the overall product design.

R2R manufacturing of displays is promoted by the non-profit FlexTech Alliance, the non-profit Organic Electronics Association , and R2R intelligent packaging is promoted by the  A.I.P.I.A..  Academic research and development is currently being done at the Glenn H. Brown Liquid Crystal Institute at Kent State University, at the Arizona State University Flexible Display Center, at the University of Florida CREOL College of Optics and Photonics, at the VTT Technical Research Centre, at Tohoku University, at the Liquid Crystal Group of the  University of Hamburg, and at the University of Stuttgart Institute for Large Area Microelectronics.

Guest host displays consume electrical current much more slowly than l.e.d.s (light emitting diodes), giving them operating life spans of several months, versus the short lifespans of battery operated l.e.d.s.

P.D.L.C. displays are commonly used as  privacy glass in homes, offices, and vehicles.  Dichroic displays had been extensively researched as robust avionics for aircraft.  Both P.D.L.C. Displays and dichroic displays can function as colorful animated skins for consumer products such as mylar balloons and greeting cards.

Guest host displays commonly comprise liquid crystals, polymer or inorganic additives, twist agent, and optionally, dichroic dyes.  Liquid crystals are distributed by Merck (DE),  Yangcheng Smiling (CN), and Phentex Corporation (US, CN).  Dichroic dyes are distributed by  Yamamoto Chemicals.  Displays are manufactured by  Polytronix (US, TW, CN), DreamGlass Group (ES),  Shenzhen Santech (CN),  P.P.I.  (US), Vitswell (CN),  Transicoil (US), and by many others.

Further reading :

Printing Processes for the Vacuum Free Manufacture of Liquid Crystal Cells with Plastic Substrates M. Randler, E. Lueder, V. Frey, J. Brill, M. Muecke, University of Stuttgart, Labor fuer Bildschirmtechnik, published by the Society for Information Display, Digest of Technical Proceedings.

Liquid Crystal Dispersions
Liquid Crystals Series, V0L 1
Volume 1 of Series on Advances in Mathematics for Applied Sciences
Series on liquid crystals
Editor	Paul S. Drzaic
Publisher	World Scientific, 1995
, 9789810217457
Liquid Crystal Dispersions 

Liquid Crystal Displays: Addressing Schemes and Electro-Optical Effects, by Ernst Lueder, Wiley, 2010, Chapter 21 and Chapter 22, Printing of Layers for LC Cells and at Google Books.

Flexible Flat Panel Displays, edited by Gregory Crawford, Wiley, 2005 and Google Books.  See the chapter Barrier Layer Technology for Flexible Displays and the chapter Roll-to-Roll Manufacturing of Flexible Displays

Liquid Crystals: Applications and Uses, Volumes 1-3, edited by Birenda Bahadur, World Scientific, 1992.  Chapter 11 Dichroic Liquid Crystal Displays and Google Books.

Reflective Liquid Crystal Displays, by Shin-Tson Wu, Deng-Ke Yang, Wiley, 2001, Chapter 6 and Google Books.

Liquid Crystals In Complex Geometries: Formed by Polymer And Porous Networks, edited by G P Crawford, S Zumer, CRC Press, 1996.

Conducting polymer substrates for plastic liquid crystal displays

References

Liquid crystals
Liquid crystal displays
Display technology
Flexible electronics
Articles containing video clips